

Events
 Egypt: start of the Twenty-fifth Dynasty
 Nubia: first pyramids built by the Nubians in El-Kurru

Births

Deaths

References

750s BC